The Wandfluhhorn (also known as Pizzo Biela) is a mountain of the Lepontine Alps, located on the border between Switzerland and Italy. It overlooks Bosco/Gurin on its (Swiss) eastern side and Formazza on its (Italian) western side. Reaching a height of 2,863 metres above sea level, the Wandfluhhorn is the highest summit of the Bosco/Gurin valley.

References

External links
 Wandfluhhorn on Hikr

Mountains of the Alps
Mountains of Switzerland
Mountains of Italy
Italy–Switzerland border
International mountains of Europe
Mountains of Ticino
Lepontine Alps